A bullet hit squib or a blood squib is a practical, pyrotechnic special effect device used mainly in the film industry, TV shows and stage performances and even in first responder moulage training to simulate the appearance of a character being shot and wounded. Typically, the effect is carried out with clothing instead of on bare skin in order to conceal the device. While the portrayal is not necessarily accurate or is exaggerated compared to real-life (in the example of the main figure, blood and smoke spews out of a down-filled jacket), it is an important component in the overall special effects process to help create a believable and dramatic scene that captures the audience's attention.

A bullet hit squib device comprises a squib (a small, tablet-shaped, firecracker-like explosive) with an integrated igniter, a pack of simulant (most commonly fake blood), a protective shield and padding attached to the actor's costume. The device is then connected to a battery and a remote, with which the squib can be triggered by the actor or a crew member. When the squib is detonated, a small explosion causes the fake blood to burst out of the pack, creating an aesthetic that filmmakers and the audience have become accustomed to associating it with a gunshot wound.

History 

Bullet hit squibs were first used in the film industry as early as 1943 in Bataan and 1955 in Pokolenie, with the latter using fake blood added in a condom and a squib, a technique still widely in use today. The use of squibs in filmmaking has become a widely accepted and well-established technique for creating convincing and realistic depictions of violence. This approach has been used in many classic films such as "The Matrix" (1999), "Goodfellas" (1990), and "The Terminator" (1984). In these films, bullet hit squibs were used to create memorable and impactful moments that helped to further the plot and engage the audience.

Preparation of the visual effect 
A special effects pyrotechnician technician builds blood squibs devices, while a costume designer prepares several identical dead-character costumes. At minimum, for minor roles, a single costume can be used throughout the scene, but typically at least three and sometimes as many as six depending on the budget. The time taken, personnel costs and materials for several takes of the stunt itself, dress rehearsals, backups and tests can therefore be costly for independent and low-budget filmmakers. Bullet hit squib devices are incorporated into the costume in such a way that their presence is not obvious to the audience. For instance, the squibs should be made with a low profile and not bulge significantly, and the fabric does not appear deliberately cut.

Bullet hit squib device 
The squib itself is typically a 0.5–1.0 grain/0.03–0.06g of a flat disc-shaped encapsulated explosives (by comparison, a party popper is ~0.25 grain/~0.015g, and a small firecracker is ~2.5 grain/~0.15g), suitable for approximately 10–30 ml of fake blood, simulating an entry or an exit wound, respectively. The amount of fake blood also depends on how quickly it will soak the fabric, taking into account the overal aesthetic of the visual effect. It is then filled in a small balloon, packet or condom, which sits atop the squib, followed by a grooved metal or plastic protective plate and padding material approximately 25mm in diameter. The entire build is assembled with duct tape, leaving a small front window where the simulant can burst through the path of least resistance. Wet simulants such as fake blood, non-staining varieties like water (for rehearsals), glycerine (for night time shoots) or dry simulants like dust, down feathers (for the desired gunshot aesthetic on a down jacket) are employed. The size and weight of the entire bullet hit squib is in the order of ~50mm diameter, ~15mm thick, weighing ~30g. The bottom half of the blood packet is aligned to the squib to produce an aerosolised burst, followed by a stream of fake blood like the main figure.

Dead character costumes 

Dead-character costumes are modified stage clothes worn by actors whose characters are killed off. Bullet hit squibs simulating a gunshot wound are usually concealed beneath the wardrobe. For bare skin gunshot wounds, other methods such as prosthetics may be used instead. Typically, at least one hero piece (used in prior scenes and closeups without squibs) and several more stunt pieces (with squibs and prescored bullet holes) are prepared for the planned number of takes, backups and tests. Bullet holes on the clothing's fabric must first be weakened (by law) by cutting, sanding, scoring, grating or plunging a scoring tool, after which they are loosely glued or taped back together. In most cases, each replicate of the dead-character costumes is used once per take, although some types of clothing can be reused. Fake blood can be wiped off waterproof jackets, parkas and down jackets for a new take, as long as the bullet holes are cleanly cut beforehand. Using the aforementioned dry or non-staining simulants can also help reuse the outfits for another take. Jackets are also better at concealing the device's bulge due to their filling compared to e.g. a t-shirt, better at supporting multiple squibs and are easier to wear and remove. The downside however is that the stronger fabric requires significant weakening beforehand and/or a more powerful squib.

Assembly and costume donning 

The squibs are aligned to the precut bullet holes and are taped or sewn to the costume securely so they do not move when worn by the actor, and more importantly, allowing the fake blood to be propelled out of the bullet hole instead of running down on the inside of the costume, as shown in the accompanying figure. The two-layered down and shell jackets allow for easy assembly, removal and reuse. They are also easy to put on and thus minimises the risk of premature rupturing of the blood packet. The squibs are then connected to a trigger, a power source (e.g. battery) and sometimes also a programmable controller to sync with multiple squibs. The electronics can be placed in the clothing or off camera. The technician then performs a test fire to check the wiring is done correctly. The actor and crew should rehearse the scene with the costume and squibs in place, testing the timing and activation of the squibs and, if necessary, make adjustments to e.g. the amount of fake blood to ensure a realistic and convincing effect.

The actor can change into the prepared outfit immediately prior to the shot (if hero and stunt pieces are available), wear it throughout a scene (e.g. in stage productions) or even the entire day, although a two-step ignition procedure should be used to avoid accidental triggering, i.e. one switch with the actor and another with the crew off-camera. Squibs can be triggered with a wired or wireless remote by a crew member or by the actor him/herself. A wireless solution would enable the actor to walk around, and the electronics would therefore be self-contained. A wired, but much simpler solution would be to run a wired remote to the actor's hand or down the pants to the crew off camera.

Firing the bullet hit 
When the trigger button is pressed on cue (e.g. a sentence in the script, a countdown, a location), the squib detonates and bursts the blood packet and rips open and the pre-made bullet hole, creating the visual effect. The actor jolts his/her body simultaneously to portray the impact of being hit by bullets. The bullet hit squib effect is safe and painless when it is built and padded properly with all safety instructions followed The actor should also avoid looking directly at the squibs and keep their arms away.

After the stunt, the actor remains still while the technician checks for any misfires. In the unlikely situation of a no-fire, power is first disconnected and the circuits are rechecked, and squib devices are replaced if necessary. A spare stunt costume would in this instance reduce downtime between takes. If the stunt is executed as planned, the wardrobe department photographs the 'aftermath' for continuity. The spent wardrobe may be removed for a new take, bullet holes enhanced for the following scene or cleaned up.

Post-production 
In most cases, the footage is cut to a few frames prior to the squibs are fired to hide the bulge of the squibs embedded beneath the costumes and scoring marks on the fabric, to not give away the effect. Nevertheless, it is possible to digitally erase them in post-production with a reference frame and content-aware fill to a certain extent. The effect is also further enhanced with post-production sound effects.

Alternative practical bullet hit devices 

Low- or no-budget filmmakers also achieve the visual effect using the same setup, but without squibs. A fishing line tied to a washer superglued onto the blood pack can be fed through the precut hole and pulled to trigger the effect. A rocket igniter or an electric match could also be used instead. These methods largely reproduces the same effect of a stream of blood flowing out, but without the initial puff propelled by the squib.

Alternate, more advanced methods have also been developed in the 2010s with pneumatics (compressed air). These devices are generally safer and do not require specialised pyrotechnicians, which also reduce cost. While they are reusable, they are bulkier and heavier, and is not preferred for multiple bullet hits, as well as being more difficult to control, less consistent and less reliable. Pneumatic alternates may still be referred to as "squibs", even though they do not use explosive substances. The pneumatic-based devices were originally developed from garden sprayers in the early 2000s and then further refined. The resulting look is less convincing as a jet of blood sprays out instead of a 'burst'. Tubing was also difficult to conceal, as it is generally quite rigid.

Miscellaneous 
The record for the most squibs ever set off on a person is held by Mike Daugherty in 2005, on whom 157 out of 160 squibs successfully detonated.

See also
 Bodily mutilation in film
 Dead-character costume
 Fake blood
 Firecracker
 Practical effect
 Pyrotechnics
 Special effect
 Squib (explosive)

References

Pyrotechnics
Special effects
Stagecraft